Acidopsidae is a family of crustaceans belonging to the order Decapoda.

Genera:
 Acidops Stimpson, 1871
 Caecopilumnus Borradaile, 1902
 Crinitocinus P.K.L.Ng & Rahayu, 2014
 Parapilumnus Kossmann, 1877
 Raoulia P.K.L.Ng, 1987
 Thecaplax P.K.L.Ng & Rahayu, 2014
 Typhlocarcinodes Alcock, 1900

References

Crustaceans